Parkdale was a provincial riding electing Members of Provincial Parliament (MPP) to the Legislative Assembly of Ontario. The riding was created from the western part of Toronto West riding in 1914 and abolished in 1996 and redistributed into the Parkdale—High Park, Davenport and Trinity—Spadina ridings for the 1999 Ontario general election.

Boundaries

1914, 1919 & 1923

The Parkdale electoral district's first incarnation was for the 1914 Ontario general election. The following described boundaries were in force for the 1914, 1919 and 1923 Ontario general elections. Its boundaries started north-westerly at the city's northern limits with York Township, starting just south of Lavender Road, through the northern side of Rowntree Avenue, continuing just north of  Innes Avenue, to its eastern border through Prospect Cemetery. The boundary then went southwards along Prospect Cemetery's eastern border until it converged with  Lansdowne Avenue  at St. Clair Avenue West. The eastern boundary followed Lansdowne all the way to Queen Street West, where it went eastward for a block, then went down the western side of Dunn Avenue to Lake Ontario. The western boundary started at the eastern side of Keele Street (since 1921, this part of Keele Street is named Parkside Drive) at Queen Street West (since 1956, this is called The Queensway). From there, the boundary went north to Bloor Street West where it then went eastward to point east of Indian Road (or about half-way between present day Indian Road and Dorval Avenue). It then travelled north along Indian Road to Humberside Avenue. It went east along Humberside until it intersected with the western Grand Trunk Railway  — after 1921, the Canadian National Railway (C.N.R.) — tracks. It went north-westerly until it intersected with the east–west Canadian Pacific Railway (C.P.R.) tracks. It went east along the C.P.R. tracks to the north-south Grand Trunk tracks, where the western boundary went north again along the tracks and connected with the northern boundary at the city limits, just south of Lavender Road.

1926, 1929
For the 1926 election, Parkdale's northernmost boundary was the east–west C.P.R. tracks, just north of Dupont Avenue. The northern boundary then went east until the C.N.R. tracks near Lansdowne Avenue. From there, the boundary went south along the C.N.R. tracks to Dundas Street West. From there the eastern boundary went west on Dundas for about a block to the western side of Sorauren Avenue. It then plunged south along Sorauren to Queen Street West, then followed the southern part of Queen, easterly until Dowling Avenue. It then plunged south again to the southern border, Lake Ontario.  The western boundary started on land at the western edge of High Park, which was the city limits. The western boundary continued north to Bloor Street West at Clendenan Avenue/Windego Way. It continued eastwards to Indian Road. It then travelled north along Indian Road to Humberside Avenue. From there it went east on Humberside until it intersected the western C.N.R. tracks. The boundary then went north-westerly until it intersected with the northern boundary at the east-west C.P.R.tracks. These boundaries were also in force for the 1929 Ontario general election as well.

1934, 1937 & 1938
Redistribution gave Parkdale some of the area that was previously part of the Brockton electoral district. It also relinquished all the area north of Bloor Street West. The northern border was a straight line from approximately Clendenan Avenue straight to Brock Avenue. The boundary then went south along Brock Avenue to Queen Street West. It went east again, along the south side of Queen until Elm Grove Avenue. It went south along Elm Grove until King Street West. At King Street West, it went west along King's north side until Spencer Avenue. The boundary then moved south along Spencer's western side all the way to the southern boundary, Lake Ontario.  The western boundary on land started at the city limits on the west side of High Park. It went straight along the City Limits until it again met Bloor Street West at approximately Clendenan Avenue/Wendigo Way.

1943, 1945 & 1948
Parkdale's northernmost boundary was the east-west C.P.R. tracks, just north of Dupont Avenue. The northern boundary then went east until Lansdowne Avenue. It then went south to Wallace Avenue. It then went east along Wallace's south side to Brock Avenue. The boundary then went south along Brock Avenue to Queen Street West. It went east again, along the south side of Queen until Elm Grove. It went south along Elm Grove until King Street West. At King Street West, it went west along King's north side until Spencer Avenue. The boundary then moved south along Spencer's western side all the way to the southern boundary, Lake Ontario. The western boundary started on land at the western edge of High Park, which was the city limits. The western boundary continued north to Bloor Street West at Wendigo Way. It continued eastwards to Indian Road. It then travelled north along Indian Road to Humberside Avenue. From there it travelled along western C.N.R. tracks until it met up with the northern boundary at the east-west C.P.R.tracks.

1951

Parkdale's northernmost boundary was the east-west C.P.R. tracks, just north of Dupont Avenue. The northern boundary then went east untilLansdowne Avenue. It then went south to Wallace Avenue. It then went east along Wallace's south side to Brock Avenue. The boundary then went south along Brock Avenue to Queen Street West. It went east again, along the south side of Queen until Elm Grove. It went south along Elm Grove until King Street West. At King Street West, it went west along King's north side until Spencer Avenue. The boundary then moved south along Spencer's western side all the way to the southern boundary, Lake Ontario. The western boundary started on the eastern edge of the Humber River, going north to the C.N.R. Lakeshore tracks. It went east along these tracks to the city limits, at the western edge of High Park. The western boundary continued in a straight-line north to Bloor Street West, near Wendigo Way. It continued eastwards to Indian Road. It then travelled north along Indian Road to Humberside Avenue. From there it travelled along western C.N.R. tracks until it met up with the northern boundary at the east-west C.P.R.tracks.

1955, 1959 & 1963
Parkdale's northernmost boundary was the east-west C.P.R. tracks, just north of Dupont Avenue. The northern boundary then went east until Lansdowne Avenue. It then went south to Wallace Avenue. It then went east along Wallace's south side to Brock Avenue. The boundary then went south along Brock Avenue to Queen Street West. It went east again, along the south side of Queen until Elm Grove Avenue. It went south along Elm Grove until King Street West. At King Street West, it went west along King's north side until Spencer Avenue. The boundary then moved south along Spencer's western side all the way to the southern boundary, Lake Ontario. The western boundary started on the eastern edge of the Humber River, going north to the C.N.R. Lakeshore tracks. It went east along these tracks to the city limits, at the western edge of High Park. The western boundary continued in a straight-line north to Bloor Street West, near Wendigo Way. It continued eastwards to the C.N.R./C.P.R. tracks. From there it travelled north-westerly along C.N.R. tracks until it met up with the northern boundary at the east-west C.P.R.tracks.

1967, 1971

Prior to the 1967 election, a major redrawing of the boundaries took place in 1966. Parkdale's northernmost boundary was the city limits with The Borough of York, starting south of Lavender Road,  through the northern side of Rowntree Avenue, continuing just north of  Innes Avenue, to its eastern border through Prospect Cemetery. The boundary then went southwards from a point starting across the street from Morrison Avenue on Harvie Avenue. The eastern border went down Harvie until it turned east at St. Clair Avenue West, going as far as Greenlaw Avenue. It then went south on Greenlaw until  Davenport Road. The boundary continued south along Primrose Avenue until the east-west C.P.R. railway tracks. It then continued south along Emerson Avenue until it reached Wallace Avenue. It went east along Wallace until Brock Avenue. It then continued south along Brock Avenue all the way to Queen Street West, where it went eastward for a block, then went down the western side of Elm Grove Avenue toKing Street West. The boundary then jogged west along King for about a block to Spencer Avenue. It then went south all the way to Lake Ontario. The western boundary started on the lakefront, at approximately a point 250 metres directly south of Dowling Avenue. It went north along Dowling until King Street West. It jogged slightly west and continued north along Beatty Avenue to Queen Street West. A short jog east along Queen before continuing north along Sorauren Avenue to Dundas Street West. It went east along the southern side of Dundas to the C.N.R./C.P.R. tracks. The boundary followed the C.N.R. tracks in a north-westerly direction up to the old York-Toronto city limits.

1975, 1977, 1981 & 1985

The 1975 boundary redistribution gave the Parkdale electoral district some territory from the old High Park district. The boundaries were in effect for the 1975 Ontario general election to the 1985 Ontario general election. Parkdale's northernmost boundary was the city's northern boundary with The Borough of York, starting south of Lavender Road,  through the northern side of Rowntree Avenue, continuing just north of  Innes Avenue, to its eastern border through Prospect Cemetery. The boundary then went southwards from a point starting across the street from Morrison Avenue on Harvie Avenue. The eastern border went down Harvie until it turned east at St. Clair Avenue West, going as far as Greenlaw Ave. It then went south on Greenlaw until Davenport Road. The boundary continued south along Primrose Avenue until the east-west C.P.R. railway tracks. It then continued south along Emerson Avenue until it reached Wallace Avenue. It went east along Wallace until Brock Avenue. It then continued south along Brock Avenue all the way to Queen Street West, where it went eastward for a block, then went down the western side of Elm Grove Avenue to King Street West. The boundary then jogged west along King for about a block to Spencer Avenue. It then went south all the way to Lake Ontario. The western boundary started on the lakefront, at approximately a point 250 metres south of Dowling Avenue. It went north to Dowling Avenue and the Gardiner Expressway. It kept going west along the westbound lanes on the Gardiner to a point south of Sunnyside Avenue. It then proceeded to go east along the south side of The Queensway until it reached Roncesvalles Avenue. From there, the boundary went north to Bloor Street West where it then went eastward to the north-south C.P.R. railway tracks. It then travelled north-west along C.P.R. tracks and connected with the northern boundary at the city limits, just south of Lavender Road.

1987, 1990 & 1995

The final electoral district redistribution was in place for the 1987 Ontario general election, and pushed Parkdale's boundaries  a bit further east. The northern border was a straight line from the intersection of Bloor Street West and Dundas Street West, straight across Bloor to Ossington Avenue. The boundary then went south along Ossington Avenue to College Street. It went west along College until it reached Dovercourt Road. The boundary continued south along Dovercourt, crossing King Street West to Atlantic Avenue where it continued south until the Gardiner Expressway west-bound lanes. The boundary then jogged east along the Gardiner to Strachan Avenue. It then went south on Strachan to Lake Ontario. The western boundary on land started at the waterfront immediately south of Roncesvalles Avenue. The boundary then went north along Roncesvalles to Dundas Street West, and continued on Dundas until it met up with Bloor Street West. The district was abolished in 1996, when provincial legislation redistributed all provincial districts to follow the same boundaries as Ontario's federal electoral districts.

Members of Provincial Parliament

Election results

1910s

1920s

1930s

1940s

1950s

1960s

1970s

1980s

1990s

References

Notes

Citations

Former provincial electoral districts of Ontario
Provincial electoral districts of Toronto